Marià Rodríguez i Vázquez (1909 - 18 June 1939) was a Catalan anarcho-syndicalist leader, popularly known as Marianet.

Biography 
He was born in Barcelona in 1909. He was ethnically Romani and was orphaned as a child, which is why he spent part of his childhood in the Duran Asylum, from where he often fled. As a young man he engaged in crime and was imprisoned, where he made contact with libertarian prisoners and rationalist teachers he adopted anarcho-syndicalism and abandoned crime.

He was regional secretary of the Catalan National Confederation of Labor (CNT) between November 1936 and June 1939. After the resignation of Horacio Martínez Prieto, he also assumed the position of national secretary of the CNT. He played a decisive role in the evolution of anarcho-syndicalism and political and social life during the course of the Spanish Civil War. Later in the conflict, he advocated active collaboration with the republican government of Juan Negrín, which led to accusations of treason and revisionism by some CNT sectors.

Towards the end of the war, before the Catalonia Offensive, he was forced to leave Spain and went into exile in France. He settled in Paris, from where he tried to organize the CNT in exile. He also participated in the creation of the Spanish Refugee Evacuation Service (SERE) along with other politicians from the republican faction. On 8 February 1939 he participated together with other anarchist leaders in a meeting held in the French capital, which he attended as head of the National Committee of the CNT and proposed a prolonged republican resistance, in order to "make themselves feared".

He drowned in the river Marne, in La Ferté-sous-Jouarre, on 18 June 1939. His companion, Conchita Davila, went into exile in Mexico where she died on 30 August 1974.

References

Bibliography 
 
 
 
 
 

1909 births
1939 deaths
Spanish Romani people
People from Barcelona
Anarcho-syndicalists
Confederación Nacional del Trabajo members
Secretaries General of the Confederación Nacional del Trabajo